Divine retribution is supernatural punishment of a person, a group of people, or everyone by a deity in response to some action. Many cultures have a story about how a deity exacted punishment upon previous inhabitants of their land, causing their doom.

An example of divine retribution is the story found in many cultures about a great flood destroying all of humanity, as described in the Epic of Gilgamesh, the Hindu Vedas, or Book of Genesis (6:9–8:22), leaving one principal 'chosen' survivor. In the first example, it is Utnapishtim, and in the last example Noah. References in the New Testament and the Quran to a man named Nuh (Noah) who was commanded by God to build an ark also suggest that one man and his followers were saved in a great flood.

Other examples in Hebrew religious literature include the dispersion of the builders of the Tower of Babel (Genesis 11:1–9), the destruction of Sodom and Gomorrah (Genesis 18:20–21, 19:23–28) (Quran 7:80–84), and the Ten Plagues visited upon the ancient Egyptians for persecuting the children of Israel (Exodus, Chapters 7–12).

In Greek mythology, the goddess Hera often became enraged when her husband, Zeus, would impregnate mortal women, and would exact divine retribution on the children born of such affairs. In some versions of the myth, Medusa was turned into her monstrous form as divine retribution for her vanity; in others it was a punishment for being raped by Poseidon.

The Bible refers to divine retribution as, in most cases, being delayed or "treasured up" to a future time. Sight of God's supernatural works and retribution would militate against faith in God's Word. William Lane Craig says, in Paul’s view, God’s properties, his eternal power and deity, are clearly revealed in creation, so that people who fail to believe in an eternal, powerful creator of the world are without excuse. Indeed, Paul says that they actually do know that God exists, but they suppress this truth because of their unrighteousness.

Some religions or philosophical positions have no concept of divine retribution, nor posit a God being capable of or willing to express such human sentiments as jealousy, vengeance, or wrath. For example, in Deism and Pandeism, the creator does not intervene in our Universe at all, either for good or for ill, and therefore exhibits no such behavior. In Pantheism (as reflected in Pandeism as well), God is the Universe and encompasses everything within it, and so has no need for retribution, as all things against which retribution might be taken are simply within God. This view is reflected in some pantheistic or pandeistic forms of Hinduism, as well.

Buddhism
The concept of divine retribution is resolutely denied in Buddhism. Gautama Buddha did not endorse belief in a creator deity, refused to express any views on creation and stated that questions on the origin of the world are worthless. The non-adherence to the notion of an omnipotent creator deity or a prime mover is seen by many as a key distinction between Buddhism and other religions, though precise beliefs vary widely from sect to sect and "Buddhism" should not be taken as a single, holistic religious concept.

Buddhists do accept the existence of beings in higher realms (see Buddhist cosmology), known as devas, but they, like humans, are said to be suffering in samsara, and are not necessarily wiser than us. The Buddha is often portrayed as a teacher of the gods, and superior to them. Despite this, there are believed to be enlightened devas. But since there may also be unenlightened devas, there also may be godlike beings who engage in retributive acts, but if they do so, then they do so out of their own ignorance of a greater truth.

Despite this nontheism, Buddhism nevertheless fully accepts the theory of karma, which posits punishment-like effects, such as rebirths in realms of torment, as an invariable consequence of wrongful actions. Unlike in most Abrahamic monotheistic religions, these effects are not eternal, though they can last for a very long time. Even theistic religions do not necessarily see such effects as "punishment" imposed by a higher authority, rather than natural consequences of wrongful action.

Judaism and Christianity

"The wrath of God", an anthropomorphic expression for the attitude which some believe God has towards sin, is mentioned many times in the Bible.

Hebrew Bible

Divine retribution is often portrayed in the Tanak or Old Testament.
 Genesis 3:14–24 – Curse upon Adam and Eve and expulsion from the Garden of Eden; Disobedience
 Genesis 4:9–15 – Curse upon Cain after his slaying of his brother, Abel
 Genesis 6–7 – The Great Flood; Rampant evil and Nephilim
 Genesis 11:1–9 – The confusion of languages at the Tower of Babel; To scatter them over the Earth
 Genesis 19:23–29 – Destruction of Sodom and Gomorrah; people of no redeeming value
 Genesis 38:6–10 – Destruction of Er and Onan; wickedness in the Lord's sight
 Exodus 7–14 – Plagues of Egypt; to establish his power over that of the gods of Egypt
 Exodus 19:10–25 – Divine threatenings at Mount Sinai; warn that the mountain is off limits and holy
 Exodus 32 – Plagues at the incident of the golden calf; disowning the people for breaking his covenant with them
 Leviticus 10:1–2 – Nadab and Abihu are burned; offering unauthorised fire in their censers
 Leviticus 26:14–39 – Curses upon the disobedient; divine warning
 Numbers 11 – A plague accompanies the giving of manna in the wilderness; rejecting his gracious gift of heavenly food and failing his test of obedience
 Numbers 16 – The rebellion of Korah, Dathan, and Abiram – Their supernatural deaths and the plague that followed; insolence and attempting self-promotion to roles they were unworthy of holding
 Numbers 20:9–13 – Reprimand of Moses at the water of Meribah; disobeying the Lord's instruction, showing distrust and indifference in God's presence
 Numbers 21 – Murmuring of the people and the plague of fiery flying serpent; spurning God's grace
 Numbers 25 – Whoredom with the Moabites and resulting plague; breaching God's covenant through sexual immorality and worshipping other gods
 Deuteronomy 28 – Curses pronounced upon the disobedient; another divine warning
 1 Samuel 6:19 – some/many men of Beth Shemesh killed; Looking into the Ark of the Covenant
 2 Samuel 6:1–7 – Uzzah struck dead; Touching the Ark of the Covenant
 1 Kings 11 – God promises to tear King Solomon's kingdom from his son except for a single tribe; Building altars to other gods for his wives
  – sending trials to the just man Job

New Testament 

The wrath of God is mentioned in at least twenty verses of the New Testament. Examples are:
  – John the Baptist declares that whoever believes in the Son has eternal life; whoever does not obey the Son shall not see life, but the wrath of God remains on him.
  – Ananias and his wife Sapphira struck dead, Holding back some of the proceeds after selling a piece of property
  – For the wrath of God is revealed from heaven against all ungodliness and unrighteousness of men, who by their unrighteousness suppress the truth.
  –  Since, therefore, we have now been justified by his blood, much more shall we be saved by him from the wrath of God.
  – Beloved, never avenge yourselves, but leave it to the wrath of God, for it is written, "Vengeance is mine, I will repay, says the Lord."
  – Let no one deceive you with empty words, for because of these things the wrath of God comes upon the sons of disobedience.
  – For the great day of his wrath has come, and who is able to withstand?
  – So the angel swung his sickle across the earth and gathered the grape harvest of the earth and threw it into the great winepress of the wrath of God.
  – Then I saw another sign in heaven, great and marvelous: seven angels having the seven last plagues, for in them the wrath of God was finished.
  – From his mouth comes a sharp sword with which to strike down the nations, and he will rule them with a rod of iron. He will tread the winepress of the fury of the wrath of God the Almighty.

Alleged modern examples
The 1953 Waco tornado outbreak was regarded by some people in the local African-American community as divine retribution for the lynching of Jesse Washington over thirty years prior.

Various Christian, Jewish and Muslim religious leaders claimed that Hurricane Katrina was God's punishment on America, New Orleans or the world for any of a variety of alleged sins, including abortion, sexual immorality (including the gay pride event Southern Decadence), the policies of the American Empire, failure to support Israel, and failure of black people to study the Torah.

The 2007 UK floods were claimed by Graham Dow to be God's punishment against homosexuals.

Televangelist Pat Robertson stirred up controversy after claiming that the 2010 Haiti earthquake may have been God's belated punishment on Haitians for allegedly having made a "pact with the Devil" to overthrow the French during the Haitian Revolution. Yehuda Levin, an Orthodox Jewish rabbi, linked the earthquake to gays in the military via an alleged Talmudic teaching that homosexuality causes earthquakes. Levin posted a video onto YouTube the same day as 2011 Virginia earthquake in which he said, "The Talmud states, "You have shaken your male member in a place where it doesn’t belong. I too, will shake the Earth." He said that homosexuals shouldn't take it personally: "We don’t hate homosexuals. I feel bad for homosexuals. It’s a revolt against God and literally, there’s hell to pay."

Chaplain John McTernan said that Hurricane Isaac, like Hurricane Katrina, was God's punishment on homosexuals. Buster Wilson of the American Family Association concurred that statement.

McTernan also said that Hurricane Sandy may have been God's punishment against homosexuals. In addition, WorldNetDaily columnist William Koenig, along with McTernan himself, suggested that American support for a two-state solution to the Israeli-Palestinian conflict led to the hurricane.

Rebuttals
Orthodox rabbi Shmuley Boteach denounces such claims since they carry the implication of victim blaming,  writing that "For many of the faithful, the closer they come to God, the more they become enemies of man." He contrasts the Jewish tradition, which affords a special place to "arguing with God", with an approach to religion that "taught people not to challenge, but to submit. Not to question, but to obey. Not how to stand erect, but to be stooped and bent in the broken posture of the meek and pious". Speaking about the COVID-19 pandemic, Boteach said "I utterly reject and find it sickening when people believe that this is some kind of punishment from God – that really upsets me."

A Jesuit priest, James Martin, wrote on Twitter in response to Hurricane Sandy that "If any religious leaders say tomorrow that the hurricane is God's punishment against some group they're idiots. God's ways are not our ways."

See also
 Christian eschatology
 Confirmation bias
 Divine judgment
 Divine providence
 Eye for an eye
 Just-world hypothesis
 Karma
 Mills of God
 Nemesis
 Penal substitution
 "Retribution" (poem)
 Retributive justice
 Societal collapse
 Western Christianity

References

External links
 R. G. V. Tasker. The Biblical Doctrine of the Wrath of God
 Gili Kugler, When God Wanted to Destroy the Chosen People: Biblical Traditions and Theology on the Move
 W. L. Craig.True Love: The Doctrine of Divine Retribution
 Herbert W. Byrne. The Wrath of God (2005 )

Christian terminology
Attributes of God in Christian theology
Relationship between Heaven and Mankind